Hermann Fliege (9 September 1829, Stendal, Germany – 8 November 1907, St Petersburg) was a German composer and conductor.  In 1882 he was appointed the first director of what would later become the St Petersburg Philharmonic Orchestra when he was named leader of a band of 100 musicians at the court of Tsar Alexander III.  He continued to hold this position until his death in 1907.

Compositions 
 Eine fromme Schwester (opera)

References

External links 

German composers
German conductors (music)
German male conductors (music)
1829 births
1907 deaths
19th-century German musicians
19th-century German male musicians